The Theban Tomb TT25 is located in El-Assasif. It forms part of the Theban Necropolis, situated on the west bank of the Nile opposite Luxor. The tomb is the burial place of the ancient Egyptian official, Amenemhab.

Amenemhab was a high priest of Khonsu from the Ramesside period. His wife Tausert was chief of the harem of Khonsu.

See also
 List of Theban tombs

References

Buildings and structures completed in the 13th century BC
Theban tombs